John Adalbert Lukacs (Hungarian: Lukács János Albert; 31 January 1924 – 6 May 2019) was a Hungarian-born American historian and author of more than thirty books. Lukacs was Roman Catholic. Lukacs described himself as a reactionary.

Life and career
Lukacs was born in Budapest, Hungary, the son of Magdaléna Glück and Pál Lukács (born Löwinger), a physician. His parents, Jewish converts to Roman Catholicism, were divorced before World War II. Lukacs attended a classical gymnasium, had an English language tutor, and spent two summers at a private school in England. He studied history at the University of Budapest.

During the Second World War, when German troops occupied Hungary in 1944, Lukacs was forced to serve in a Hungarian labour battalion for Jews. By the end of 1944, he had deserted from the battalion and was hiding in a cellar until the end of the war, evading deportation to death camps and surviving the siege of Budapest. According to his son, Lukacs never saw his parents again.

After the war, Lukacs worked as the Secretary of the Hungarian-American Society. In 1946, he received his doctorate from the University of Budapest.

On 22 July 1946, as it was becoming clear that Hungary would become a Communist state, he fled to the United States. He found employment as a part-time assistant lecturer at Columbia University in New York City. He then relocated to Philadelphia, where in 1947 he began work as a history professor at Chestnut Hill College, a women's college at the time.

He was a professor of history at Chestnut Hill College until 1994 and chaired the history department from 1947 to 1974. He served as a visiting professor at Johns Hopkins University, Columbia University, Princeton University, La Salle University, Regent College in British Columbia and the University of Budapest and Hanover College.

He was a president of the American Catholic Historical Association and member of both the Royal Historical Society and the American Philosophical Society.

Views 
Being a proponent of a liberal democracy and an anti-Communist, Lukacs nevertheless wrote in the early 1950s several articles in Commonweal criticizing the approach taken by Senator Joseph McCarthy, whom he described as a vulgar demagogue.

Lukacs saw populism as the primary threat to modern civilization. By his own description, he considered himself a reactionary. He identified populism as the essence of both Nazism and Communism, denying the existence of generic fascism and asserted that the differences between the political regimes of Nazi Germany and Fascist Italy were greater than their similarities.

A major theme in Lukacs's writing is his agreement with the French historian Alexis de Tocqueville that aristocratic elites have been replaced by democratic elites, which obtain power via an appeal to the masses. In his 2002 book, At the End of an Age, Lukacs argued that the modern/bourgeois age, which began around the time of the Renaissance, is coming to an end. The rise of populism and the decline of elitism is the theme of his experimental work, A Thread of Years (1998), a series of vignettes set in each year of the 20th century from 1900 to 1998, tracing the abandonment of gentlemanly conduct and the rise of vulgarity in American culture. Lukacs defends traditional Western civilization against what he sees as the leveling and debasing effects of mass culture.

An Anglophile, Lukacs gives the highest historical importance to Winston Churchill. He considered Churchill to be the greatest statesman of the 20th century, the savior not only of Great Britain but also of Western civilization itself. A recurring theme in his writing is the duel between Churchill and Adolf Hitler for mastery of the world. Their moral struggle, which Lukacs sees as a conflict between the archetypical reactionary and the archetypical revolutionary, is the major theme of The Last European War (1976), The Duel (1991), Five Days in London (1999) and 2008's Blood, Toil, Tears and Sweat, a book which features Churchill's first major speech as Prime Minister. Lukacs argues that Great Britain (and by extension the British Empire) could not defeat Germany by itself and that winning required the entry of the United States and the Soviet Union. He points out that by inspiring the British people to resist German air attacks and to "never surrender" during the Battle of Britain in 1940, Churchill laid the groundwork for the subsequent victory of the Allies.

Lukacs had strong isolationist beliefs and unusually for an anti-Communist émigré also had "surprisingly critical views of the Cold War from a unique conservative perspective". Lukacs claimed that the Soviet Union was a feeble power on the verge of collapse and contended that the Cold War was an unnecessary waste of American treasure and life. Likewise, Lukacs was critical of American intervention abroad and also condemned the 2003 invasion of Iraq.

In his book George F. Kennan and the Origins of Containment, 1944-1946 (1997), a collection of letters exchanged between Lukacs and his close friend George F. Kennan during 1994–1995, Lukacs and Kennan criticized the claim of the New Left that the Cold War was caused by the United States. However, Lukacs argued that while Joseph Stalin was largely responsible for the beginning of the Cold War, the administration of Dwight D. Eisenhower missed a chance for ending the Cold War in 1953 after Stalin's death, which kept it on for many more decades.

The Hitler of History 
From around 1977 onwards, Lukacs became one of the leading critics of the British author David Irving, whom Lukacs accused of engaging in unscholarly practices and having neo-Nazi sympathies. In a review of Irving's Hitler's War in 1977, Lukacs commented that as a "right-wing revisionist" who had admired some of Irving's early works, he initially had high hopes for Hitler's War, but he found the book to be "appalling". Lukacs commented that Irving had uncritically used personal remembrances by those who knew Hitler to present him in the most favorable light possible. In his review, Lukacs argued that although World War II ended with Eastern Europe being left under Soviet domination, a victory that left only half of Europe to Stalin was much better than a defeat that left all of Europe to Hitler.

Lukacs’s book The Hitler of History (1997), a prosopography of the historians who have written biographies of Hitler, is in part a critique of Irving’s work. Lukacs considered Irving to be sympathetic to the Nazis. In turn, Irving has engaged in what many consider to be antisemitic and racist attacks against Lukacs. Because Lukacs' mother was Jewish, Irving disparagingly refers to him as "a Jewish historian". In letters of 25 October and 28 October 1997, Irving threatened to sue Lukacs for libel if he published his book (The Hitler of History) without removing certain passages which were highly critical of Irving's work. The American edition of The Hitler of History was published in 1997 with the passages included, but because of Irving's legal threats no British edition of The Hitler of History was published until 2001. As a result of Irving's threat of legal action under British libel laws, when the British edition was finally published the passages containing the criticism of Irving's historical methods were expunged by the publisher.

In The Hitler of History, inspired by the example of Pieter Geyl's book, Napoleon For and Against, Lukacs examines the state of Hitler scholarship and offers his own observations about Hitler. In Lukacs's view, Hitler was a racist, nationalist, revolutionary and populist. Lukacs criticizes Marxist and liberal historians who claim that the German working class were strongly anti-Nazi and argues that the exact opposite was the case. Each chapter of The Hitler of History is devoted to a particular topic, such as whether Hitler was a reactionary or revolutionary; a nationalist or a racist; and he examines the roots of Hitler's ideology. Lukacs denies that Hitler developed a belief in racial purity in Vienna under the Habsburg monarchy. Instead, Lukacs dates Hitler's turn to antisemitism to 1919 in Munich, in particular to the events surrounding the Bavarian Soviet Republic and its defeat by the right-wing Freikorps. Much influenced by Rainer Zitelmann's work, Lukacs describes Hitler as a self-conscious, modernizing revolutionary. Citing the critique of National Socialism developed by German conservative historians such as Hans Rothfels and Gerhard Ritter, Lukacs describes the Nazi movement as the culmination of the dark forces which lurk within modern civilization.

In Lukacs’s view, Operation Barbarossa was not inspired by anti-Communism or any long-term plan to conquer the Soviet Union as suggested by historians such as Andreas Hillgruber, who claims that Hitler had a stufenplan (stage-by-stage plan), but it was rather an ad hoc reaction forced on Hitler in 1940–1941 by Britain’s refusal to surrender. Lukacs argues that the reason Hitler gave for the invasion of Russia was the real one. He claimed that Britain would not surrender because Winston Churchill held out the hope that the Soviet Union might enter the war on the Allied side and so Germany had to eliminate that hope. However, other historians have argued that the reason was just a pretext. For Lukacs, Operation Barbarossa was as much anti-British as it was anti-Soviet. He argues that Hitler's statement in August 1939 to the League of Nations High Commissioner for Danzig, the Swiss diplomat Carl Jacob Burckhardt ("Everything I undertake is directed against Russia"), which Hillgruber cited as evidence of Hitler's anti-Soviet intentions, was part of an effort to intimidate Britain and France into abandoning Poland. Lukacs takes issue with Hillgruber's claim that the war against Britain was of "secondary" importance to Hitler compared to the war against the Soviet Union. Lukacs has also been one of the leading critics of Viktor Suvorov, who has argued that Barbarossa was a "preventative war" forced upon Germany by Stalin, who according to Suvorov was planning to attack Germany later in the summer of 1941.

Later work 

In his book Democracy and Populism: Fear and Hatred (2005), Lukacs writes about the current state of American democracy. He warns that the populism he perceives as ascendant in the United States renders it vulnerable to demagoguery. He claims that a transformation from liberal democracy to populism can be seen in the replacement of knowledge and history with propaganda and infotainment. In the same book, Lukacs criticizes legalized abortion, pornography, cloning and sexual permissiveness as marking what he sees as the increasing decadence, depravity, corruption and amorality of modern American society.

June 1941: Hitler and Stalin (2006) is a book-length study of the two leaders with a focus on the events leading up to Operation Barbarossa. George Kennan: A Study of Character (2007) is a biography of Lukacs' friend George F. Kennan, based on privileged access to Kennan's private papers. Blood, Toil, Tears and Sweat (2008) is a continuation of his work on what  Lukacs considered the greatness of Churchill. Last Rites (2009) continues the "auto-history" he published in Confessions of an Original Sinner (1990). The Future of History was published on 26 April 2011.

In A Short History of the Twentieth Century (2013), Lukacs attempts to challenge the idea (common to both professional historians and experts in international relations) that the Cold War presented a bipolar system or a major strategic rivalry or conflict, instead arguing that the 20th century was one of American dominance. Citing the biographical example of Hitler as well as left- and right-wing populism in the United States, Lukacs also argues in the book that populism was the most destructive force of the 20th century and attempts to disentangle the concept of populism from its frequent (though, Lukacs argues, inaccurate) conflation with the inherent stances of left-wing politics.

Private life
In 1953, he married Helen Elizabeth Schofield, the daughter of a Philadelphia lawyer; the couple had two children. His wife died in 1971. He married his second wife, Stephanie Harvey, in 1974. From this marriage, Lukacs had step-children; his second wife died in 2003. He married for a third time, but his marriage to Pamela Hall ended in divorce.

After his retirement in 1994, Lukacs concentrated on writing. He resided in Schuylkill Township, Chester County, Pennsylvania and retained nearly 18,000 books in his home library.

Lukacs died from congestive heart failure on May 6, 2019, at his home in Phoenixville, Pennsylvania.

Works 

 The Great Powers and Eastern Europe (New York: American Book Co., 1953).
 A History of the Cold War (Garden City, N.Y.: Doubleday, 1961).
 Decline and Rise of Europe: A Study in Recent History, With Particular Emphasis on the Development of a European Consciousness (Garden City, N.Y., Doubleday, 1965).
 A New history of the Cold War (Garden City, N.Y.: Doubleday, 1966).
 Historical Consciousness; or, The Remembered Past (New York: Harper & Row, 1968).
 The Passing of the Modern Age (New York: Harper & Row, 1970).
 A Sketch of the History of Chestnut Hill College, 1924–1974 (Chestnut Hill, PA: Chestnut Hill College, 1975).
 The Last European War: September 1939–December 1941 (Garden City, N.Y.: Anchor Press, 1976).
 1945: Year Zero (New York: Doubleday, 1978).
 Philadelphia: Patricians and Philistines, 1900–1950 (New York: Farrar, Straus, Giroux, 1981).
 Outgrowing Democracy: A History of the United States in the Twentieth century (Garden City, N.Y.: Doubleday, 1984).
 Budapest 1900: A Historical Portrait of a City and Its Culture (New York: Weidenfeld & Nicolson, 1988).
 Confessions of an Original Sinner (New York: Ticknor and Fields, 1990).
 The Duel: 10 May–31 July 1940: the Eighty-Day Struggle between Churchill and Hitler (New York: Ticknor & Fields, 1991).
 The End of the Twentieth Century and the End of the Modern Age (New York: Ticknor & Fields, 1993).
 Destinations Past: Traveling through History with John Lukacs (Columbia, MO: University of Missouri Press, 1994).
 The Hitler of History (New York: A. A. Knopf, 1997).
 George F. Kennan and the Origins of Containment, 1944–1946: the Kennan-Lukacs Correspondence, Introduction by John Lukacs. (Columbia, Mo.: University of Missouri Press, 1997).
 A Thread of Years (New Haven [Conn.]: Yale University Press, 1998).
 Five Days in London, May 1940 (New Haven [Conn.]: Yale University Press, 1999).
 A Student's Guide to the Study of History (Wilmington, DE: ISI Books, Intercollegiate Studies Institute, 2000).
 Churchill: Visionary, Statesman, Historian (New Haven [Conn.]: Yale University Press, 2002).
 At the End of an Age (New Haven [Conn.]: Yale University Press, 2002).
 A New Republic: A History Of The United States In The Twentieth Century(New Haven [Conn.]: Yale University Press, 2004).
 Democracy and Populism: Fear & Hatred (New Haven: Yale University Press, 2005).
 Remembered Past: John Lukacs On History, Historians & Historical Knowledge: A Reader (Wilmington, DE: ISI Books, Intercollegiate Studies Institute, 2005).
 June 1941: Hitler and Stalin. New Haven; London: Yale University Press, 2006.
 George Kennan: A Study of Character. New Haven; London: Yale University Press, 2007.
 Blood, Toil, Tears and Sweat: The Dire Warning. New York: Basic Books, 2008.
 Last Rites. New Haven; London: Yale University Press, 2009.
 The Legacy of the Second World War. New Haven; London: Yale University Press, 2010.
 Through the History of the Cold War: The Correspondence of George F. Kennan and John Lukacs / Edited by John Lukacs. University of Pennsylvania Press, 2010.
 The Future of History. New Haven; London: Yale University Press, 2011.
 A Short History of the Twentieth Century. Harvard University Press, 2013
 We at the Center of the Universe. St. Augustines Press, 2017

See also 
 List of books by or about Adolf Hitler

References

Sources 
 Allitt, Patrick Catholic Intellectuals And Conservative Politics In America 1950-1985, Cornell University Press, 1993.
 Williamson, Chilton The Conservative Bookshelf: Essential Works That Impact Today's Conservative Thinkers, Citadel Press, 2004.

External links

Lectures 
 Three lectures by John Lukacs

Essays 
 The Universality of National Socialism (The Mistaken Category of `Fascism’) by John Lukacs
 Putting Man Before Descartes by John Lukacs

 =Further Reading=:

 Bernhard Valentinitsch,Max-Erwin von Scheubner-Richter(1885-1923)-Zeuge des Genozids an den Armeniern und früher,enger Mitarbeiter Hitlers.Diplomarbeit.Graz 2012.,(also digitalised at Harvard University Libray,dedicated to John Lukacs,with many reflexions about his work,especially his work about Hitler and similar ways of thinking in the work of Lukacs and his friend Erik von Kuehnelt-Leddihn)

Lukacs reviewed 
 George Kennan: A Study of Character Review by James Traub in The New York Times, April 29, 2007.
 The People's Hitler Does Hitler's popularity discredit populism itself?: A Review of The Hitler of History by Adam Shatz
 The Anti-Populist Traditionalist historian John Lukacs laments the direction of conservatism in America by Jeet Heer
 Review of THE HITLER OF HISTORY by John Lukacs & EXPLAINING HITLER: THE SEARCH FOR THE ORIGINS OF HIS EVIL by Ron Rosenbaum
 History in a Democratic Age: A Conversation with John Lukacs
 Towards the Fuhrer: Review of The Hitler Of History
 Churchill and His Myths
 The Lettered Reactionary (retrieved 5 January 2017) Lukacs' profile by John Rodden and John Rossi

Lukacs interviewed 
 In Depth interview with Lukacs, February 6, 2000, C-SPAN
 2005 Schuylkill Oral History Project interview: Dr. John Lukacs, December 8, 2005. Transcribed by Nancy Loane. Edited by John Lukacs on October 25, 2017. Archived  
 Interview with Lukacs on "New Books in History"

1924 births
2019 deaths
20th-century American historians
20th-century Hungarian historians
20th-century Roman Catholics
21st-century American historians
21st-century American male writers
21st-century Roman Catholics
American anti–Iraq War activists
American male non-fiction writers
American people of Hungarian-Jewish descent
American Roman Catholics
Historians of Nazism
Historians of World War II
Hungarian anti-communists
Hungarian Jews
Hungarian male writers
Hungarian Roman Catholics
Jewish anti-communists
Jewish American historians
Columbia University faculty
Hungarian World War II forced labourers
Hungarian escapees
Escapees from Nazi concentration camps
Members of the American Philosophical Society
Hungarian emigrants to the United States